Brisbane Independent School is located in semi-rural Pullenvale in the western suburbs of Brisbane, Queensland, Australia.

The community-run school operates within a cooperative family environment. The school is operated and owned by its members, who are the parent body of current students. The school has no religious or other affiliations and thus is one of the few truly independent schools.

See also
Democratic school
Democracy and Education by John Dewey
Alternative education
List of schools in Queensland
Summerhill School
Sudbury model school
List of Sudbury schools
Non-profit organization
Community organisation

External links
Brisbane Independent School Home Page
Map
Independent Schools Queensland
Pine Community School

Democratic free schools
Private secondary schools in Brisbane
Educational institutions established in 1967
1967 establishments in Australia